The canton of Billère et Coteaux de Jurançon is an administrative division of the Pyrénées-Atlantiques department, southwestern France. It was created at the French canton reorganisation which came into effect in March 2015. Its seat is in Billère.

It consists of the following communes:
Aubertin
Billère
Jurançon
Laroin
Saint-Faust

References

Cantons of Pyrénées-Atlantiques